Goliath was a giant famous for his battle with David as described in the Hebrew Bible.

Goliath may also refer to:

People with the name 
 Matumona Lundala (born 1972), an Angolan football player nicknamed "Goliath"
 Matt Parkinson (comedian), one of the Chasers on The Chase Australia nicknamed "Goliath"

Arts, entertainment, and media

Fictional characters 
 Goliath (Amalgam Comics), a fictional Amalgam Comics superhero
 Goliath (comics), any of a number of characters
 Goliath (Dungeons & Dragons), a race related to the giants in the Dungeons & Dragons fantasy role-playing game
 Goliath (fictional dog), a character in the stop-motion cartoon series Davey and Goliath
 Goliath (Gargoyles), a character in the animated television series Gargoyles (TV series)

Literature
 Goliath (Alten novel), by Steve Alten, 2002
 Goliath (graphic novel), a short fictional book by Tom Gauld
 Goliath (Westerfeld novel), by Scott Westerfeld, 2011
 Goliath (Onyebuchi novel), science fiction novel by Tochi Onyebuchi
 Goliath, a 15th-century fechtbuch (combat manual) by an anonymous author
 Goliath: Life and Loathing in Greater Israel, a 2013 nonfiction book by Max Blumenthal

Films
 Goliath, a 2008 film directed by David Zellner
 Goliath (film), a 2019 film directed by Luke Villemaire
 Goliath II, a 1960 short animated comedy film by Disney, about a tiny elephant

Music 
 Goliath (Butcher Babies album), 2013
 Goliath (Kellermensch album), 2017
 Goliath (Steve Taylor album), 2014, or the title song
 "Goliath", a song by the Mars Volta from their 2008 album The Bedlam in Goliath
 "Goliath", a song by The Silent League
 Goliath Artists, a talent firm that manages musicians

Other uses in arts, entertainment, and media
 Goliath (TV series), a 2016 television series produced by Amazon Studios
 Goliath (website), a business directory owned by Thomson Gale publishers

Biology 
 Goliath, a cultivar of Magnolia grandiflora
 Atlantic goliath grouper, a species of fish found in the Atlantic Ocean
 Eurycnema goliath, a species of stick insect found in Australia
 Goliath birdeater, largest spider in the world native to the rain forest regions of northern South America
 Goliath coucal, a cuckoo endemic to Indonesia
 Goliath frog, an African frog of genus Conraua
 Goliath heron, a very large wading bird found in sub-Saharan Africa, with smaller numbers in Southwest and South Asia
 Goliath imperial pigeon, a bird endemic to New Caledonia
 Goliath shrew, a mammal
 Goliathus or Goliath beetle, a genus of large insects
 Pacific goliath grouper, a species of fish found in the Pacific Ocean
 Goliath tiger fish

Roller coasters 
 Goliath (La Ronde), a hypercoaster in Montreal, Québec, Canada
 Goliath (Six Flags Great America), a wooden roller coaster in Gurnee, Illinois
 Goliath (Six Flags Fiesta Texas), an inverted roller coaster in San Antonio, Texas
 Goliath (Six Flags Magic Mountain), a hypercoaster located in California, United States
 Goliath (Six Flags New England), an inverted boomerang roller coaster located near Springfield, Massachusetts, United States
 Goliath (Six Flags Over Georgia), a hypercoaster located in Georgia, United States
 Goliath (Walibi Holland), a roller coaster in Biddinghuizen, Netherlands
 Magic Flyer (roller coaster), a roller coaster at Six Flags Magic Mountain formerly named Goliath Jr.

Technology and transport 
 Goliath (company), a German car brand of the Borgward group
 Goliath (locomotive), one of the four South Devon Railway Tornado class steam locomotives
 Goliath (Mangalia), a crane in Mangalia, Romania
 Goliath (Rosyth), a crane in Rosyth Dockyard, Scotland
 Goliath, one of Erickson Air-Crane's Sikorsky S-64 Skycrane heavy-lift helicopters
 Farman F.60 Goliath, the first long-distance passenger airliner
 Goliath tracked mine, a remote-controlled tracked explosive device used by the German Army during World War II
 Goliath transmitter, a VLF-transmitter of the German Navy in World War II
 HMS Goliath, the name of several British Royal Navy ships
 LVT(U)X2 Goliath, late 1950s US Navy amphibious tracked utility landing craft, manufactured by Pacific Car and Foundry
 Samson and Goliath (cranes), twin shipbuilding gantry cranes in Queen's Island, Belfast, Northern Ireland
 USS Goliath, a U.S. monitor also called

Other uses 
 Goliath (betting), a type of bet covering eight selections
 Goliath, a traditionally craft-brewed ale produced by the UK Wychwood  Brewery
 Goliath Books, a publisher of art and photography books
 Goliath language, a Papuan language of West Papua

See also 
 
 
 David and Goliath (disambiguation)